Yevgeni Nikolayevich Dyachkov (born 9 October 1975) is a retired Russian professional football player.

Club career
He played 8 seasons in the Russian Football National League for 5 different teams.

References

1975 births
People from Yoshkar-Ola
Sportspeople from Mari El
Living people
Russian footballers
Association football defenders
FC Rubin Kazan players
FC KAMAZ Naberezhnye Chelny players
FC Luch Vladivostok players
FC Neftekhimik Nizhnekamsk players
FC Novokuznetsk players
FC Zenit-Izhevsk players
FC Volga Ulyanovsk players
FC Spartak-MZhK Ryazan players